Tiga Island Park was established in 1978, although the area has been under protection as a forest reserve since 1933. It is located north of Kuala Penyu, opposite the swampy Klias Peninsula, in Sabah, Malaysia.

The park covers 158 square kilometres of mostly ocean, containing the 3 islands of Tiga, Kalampunian Besar and Kalampunian Damit. The islands were formed in 1897 by the eruption of mud volcanos.

Tiga Island is now covered in dense vegetation; however volcanic activity continues in the form of bubbling mud and methane gas venting, although the last major outpouring of mud was in the early 1960s.

Kalampunian Besar Island is now little more than a sandbar, eroded away by wave action. Known for its sugar-white sands and clear waters, it is popular for scuba diving and snorkelling.

Kalampunian Damit Island, little more than a large rock, is also called Snake Island. It is famous as a mating location for highly poisonous sea snakes.

Tiga Island Park is administered by Sabah Parks.

See also
 List of national parks of Malaysia

External links

Sabah Parks: Pulau Tiga National Park

National parks of Sabah
Protected areas established in 1978
1978 establishments in Malaysia